is a multiplatform puzzle video game developed and published by Irem. Tokuma Shoten published the game on home platforms, including the Famicom.

The player controls one arrow and has to move some pellets (which resemble pachinko balls) from the upper cells (with a four-second delay) to the lower ones without having to confront an evil crab. He will grab the player's pellets and try to prevent the player from scoring with them by cutting the elastic. The crab is forced to leave the board if there are no pellets for him to find.

References

1985 video games
Arcade video games
HAL Laboratory games
Irem games
Japan-exclusive video games
MSX games
Nintendo Entertainment System games
Puzzle video games
Tokuma Shoten games
Multiplayer and single-player video games
NEC PC-8801 games
Video games developed in Japan